For mountains or other uses, see: Jabal.
Djebel (1937–1958) was a French Thoroughbred racehorse, who won 15 of 22 races during 1939–1942 including the Prix d'Essai, 2000 Guineas and Prix de l'Arc de Triomphe. He was later a leading sire in France and is responsible for the survival of the Byerley Turk sire line into the 21st century.

Breeding
Djebel was a bay stallion owned and bred by renowned horseman Marcel Boussac. He was sired by Tourbillon, who had won the French Derby and the Prix Lupin, and went on to become a notable sire. Djebel's dam, Loika, was a minor winner by Gay Crusader and out of Coeur a Coeur. Gay Crusader was the 1917 U.K. Triple Crown winner, and by the influential Bayardo. Coeur a Coeur was by Teddy, whose grandsire was the 1899 English Triple Crown champion Flying Fox. Therefore, Djebel traced back to Bay Ronald twice through his dam (both Bayardo and Teddy's dam-sire were by Bay Ronald).

Loika was originally not a success as a broodmare, producing just one foal, a minor winner, in her first five years. In 1936, she was bred to Tourbillion and Boussac offered her in foal at the Newmarket December Sales. She did not meet her reserve so she returned home to Haras de Fresnay-le-Buffard, where she delivered Djebel in January 1937. Loika went on to produce several other winners including Hierocles, two-time winner of the Prix d'Ispahan.

Racing career
In his 22 starts, Djebel won 15, placed second in three, and finished third in one. His wins included the 1942 Prix de l'Arc de Triomphe, the 2,000 Guineas Stakes (GB), Prix des Sablons, Prix Boiard (twice), Prix d'Harcourt (twice), Prix d'Hédouville (twice), Grand Prix de Saint-Cloud, Prix d'Essai, Prix Lagrange and Middle Park Stakes. He finished second in the Prix Morny, Grand Prix de St. Cloud, and Prix de Chantilly, and third in the 1941 Prix de l'Arc de Triomphe.

Djebel was originally trained by Albert Swann at Chantilly. He started five times in 1939 at age two. In his debut at Chantilly, he finished second to the odds-on Lighthouse. He then won the Prix de Chatou at Longchamp by three lengths before finishing second to Lighthouse in the Prix d'Aumale and second to eventual champion filly Furane in the Prix Morny, with Lighthouse back in fourth. At this point, World War II broke out, stopping all racing in France. Djebel was shipped to England in November for the Middle Park Stakes, held later than usual that year on Newmarket's July Course. Djebel won easily by two lengths over the eventual English champion two-year-old Tant Mieux. Djebel was named the Champion two-year-old colt in France.

Djebel's three-year-old campaign of 1940 was interrupted due to the turbulence of the war. In March at Longchamp, he won his first start of the year, then followed up with a win on May 1 in the 2000 Guineas. He would have been the favorite for the Derby in June but was unable to travel due to the escalating war in France. He did not race again until late October when he won the Prix d'Essai, a substitute event that year for both the French 1000 and 2000 Guineas. He finished the year with a disappointing third-place finish in a replacement for the Prix du Jockey-Club, staged that year at Auteuil.

Djebel began 1941 with three wins then finished second to Maurepas in both the Grand Prix de Saint-Cloud and the Prix de Chantilly. He was the favorite for the Prix de l'Arc de Triomphe but finished third behind the then-unbeaten champion three-year-old Le Pacha.

For his five-year-old campaign in 1942, Djebel was trained by former jockey Charles Semblat, who stepped up the horse's training regimen. Djebel responded with a perfect season of seven wins, all at Longchamp. His wins included the Prix des Sablons and Prix Boïard in April, the Prix d'Harcourt in May, the Prix d'Hédouville in June and the Grand Prix de Saint-Cloud in July. In the latter, he ended Le Pacha's unbeaten streak. Djebel was given a short rest before returning in September to win the Prix de Chantilly. He then finished his career by winning the Prix de l'Arc de Triomphe where he again beat Le Pacha.

Stud record
Djebel was retired to stud in 1943 and initially received limited support due to the war. At first, his international appeal was also limited by the fact that he and his progeny could not be included in the General Stud Book (GSB) under the terms of the Jersey Act. The Jersey Act prohibited horses with American blood from being registered as Thoroughbreds in England, and Djebel's sire Tourbillon had three American ancestors in the third generation of his pedigree. Thus Djebel and his get were originally considered half-bred horses in England. In part due to their success, the Jersey Act was amended in 1949 to allow their inclusion in the GSB.

Djebel sired 36 stakes-winners which won 53 stakes-races. In France, he was the leading sire for four years (1947, 1948, 1949, and 1956), second in 1950, and in the top ten in 1952–54. In the twelve-year period from 1946 and 1958, his sons and daughters won 318 races, all together worth FF342,736,777.

His progeny included: 

He had at least 35 sons at stud around the world, including Argentina, Brazil, France, Great Britain and Japan, plus sires, Emperor and Targui in Australia and New Zealand respectively.

Djebel is responsible for the continuation of the Byerley Turk sire line into the 21st century. Through Clairon, his line includes notable winners such as Sagace, Dr Devious, Don't Forget Me, Indian Ridge, Domedriver, Notnowcato and Dunaden. Multiple Group 1 winner Cirrus des Aigles is another descendant through My Babu.

Djebel was also fairly influential in the breeding of sport horses. My Babu's progeny include the eventer JJ Babu. Djebel is also seen in the pedigree of dressage horse Bolero. Also, the grand prix jumper Napur is related to him through his sire Damascus dam Kerala. My Babu was the sire of Kerala, and therefore one of Napur's grandsires.

In July 1958 Djebel died at Haras de Fresnay-le-Buffard at the age of 21.

Pedigree

References

1937 racehorse births
1958 racehorse deaths
Arc winners
Sport horse sires
Racehorses bred in Calvados (department)
Champion Thoroughbred Sires of France
Thoroughbred family 5-j
Byerley Turk sire line
Chefs-de-Race
2000 Guineas winners